Ken Fields is an American real estate developer, entrepreneur and environmentalist.

Career

Real estate development
Fields is recognized as a hotel and hospitality investor and developer. In 2002 he purchased the Ankara Motel property on 23rd Street and Collins Avenue in the Collins Park neighborhood of South Beach. The motel was built in 1954 by the architecture firm of Reiff & Feldman and is one of the few remaining examples of googie style architecture in South Beach. Fields redeveloped the property into Miami Beach's first Arts Hotel, inviting artists to design individual rooms (notably Shepard Fairey, Camella Ehlke of Triple Five Soul and Kenzo Minami) and renamed the property The Creek South Beach. The redevelopment and design concept was widely praised by the media, winning best hotel in Miami Beach from The Miami New Times. Despite joint efforts by neighborhood associations, the City of Miami Beach and private developers, the area continues to have its ups and downs.

Fields owns a 3,000-acre cattle ranch in Uruguay. Beef from the ranch was briefly imported and made available online in the United States under the Uruguay Steaks brand. The company spokesperson and chef was Bravo TV's Top Chef'''s Lee Anne Wong.

Environmental activism
Fields has been an active participant in a number of environmental initiatives. He is a vocal advocate for renewable energy, and solar power in particular, quoted by the media discussing tax benefits and financial incentives as an industry expert in The Miami Herald'' and Plum TV. He has been a strong supporter of Ecomb (The Environmental Coalition of Miami and The Beaches) and their efforts to establish the Miami Beach Center For The Environment. In 2010 he established the not-for-profit School Charging Program to donate electric vehicle charging stations to schools and other educational institutions.

Politics
On November 30, 2015, in recognition of the 2015 United Nations Climate Change Conference Fields registered with the FEC as an Independent Presidential Candidate for 2016 although he waited until January 8, 2016 to make an official announcement. The primary platform of his campaign is based upon Mark Z. Jacobson and Mark Delucchi's The Solutions Project to advocate for the US to convert to 100% Renewable Energy in 20 Years. Picking as his campaign slogan, a jab at Donald Trump, "Greatness Must Be Earned". Fields has suggested that the effective cost of transitioning the US to 100% renewable energy would be zero, based upon a comparison of the estimated costs of renewables relative to current expenditures on energy as a percent of US GDP.

Personal life
Fields is married to Nutritionist and ex-Professional Volleyball player Nikki Noya. They live between New York City and Lakeville CT.

See also
The Creek South Beach
Ecomb
Collins Park

References

External links

Ken Fields website
Noya Fields Family Funds Charitable Foundation

American real estate businesspeople
American environmentalists
Brown University alumni
Candidates in the 2016 United States presidential election
21st-century American politicians
Living people
Date of birth missing (living people)
Year of birth missing (living people)